Lemuel Ezra Prowse (February 2, 1858 – December 17, 1925) was a merchant and political figure in Prince Edward Island. He represented 5th Queens in the Legislative Assembly of Prince Edward Island from 1893 to 1900 as a Liberal member and represented Queen's in the House of Commons of Canada from 1908 to 1911 as a Liberal.

He was born in Charlottetown, the son of William Prowse, and educated there. In 1879, he married Frances Stanley. With his brothers, he operated a dry goods store in Charlottetown. Prowse ran unsuccessfully for a federal seat in 1904; he was defeated when he ran for reelection in 1911.

His son Thomas William served in the provincial assembly and became lieutenant-governor for Prince Edward Island. His brother Benjamin Charles served as mayor of Charlottetown and in the Canadian Senate.

External links 
The Canadian parliamentary companion, 1897 JA Gemmill
 

1858 births
1925 deaths
People from Charlottetown
Prince Edward Island Liberal Party MLAs
Liberal Party of Canada MPs
Members of the House of Commons of Canada from Prince Edward Island